The Pointe de Bellevue is a mountain in the Chablais Alps, overlooking Monthey in Valais. It is located in the northern foothills, which are separated from the Dents du Midi by the Val d'Illiez and Pas de Morgins

References

External links
Pointe de Bellevue on Summitpost

Mountains of the Alps
Mountains of Valais
Two-thousanders of Switzerland
Mountains of Switzerland